Jonas Bastien Baptiste Aguenier (born 28 April 1992) is a French volleyball player. He was part of the French national team at the 2014 World Championship held in Poland. On club level, he plays for Italian team NBV Verona.

Sporting achievements

Clubs
 CEV Challenge Cup
  2016/2017 – with Chaumont VB 52
 National championships
 2016/2017  French Championship, with Chaumont VB 52 
 2017/2018  French SuperCup, with Chaumont VB 52

References

External links
 Player profile at CEV.eu
 Player profile at LegaVolley.it
 Player profile at LNV.fr
 Player profile at WorldofVolley.com
 Player profile at Volleybox.net

1992 births
Living people
French men's volleyball players
French expatriate sportspeople in Italy
Expatriate volleyball players in Italy
European Games competitors for France
Volleyball players at the 2015 European Games
Mediterranean Games medalists in volleyball
Mediterranean Games bronze medalists for France
Competitors at the 2013 Mediterranean Games
Middle blockers